The Kia KX7 is a 7-seat mid-size crossover SUV produced in China since 2017 by Dongfeng Yueda Kia.

Overview
The Kia KX7 crossover was unveiled on the 2016 Guangzhou Auto Show in China, and became available to the Chinese market on March 16, 2017. The KX7 is based on the third-generation Kia Sorento which remains an import in the Chinese market with it providing a more affordable option. It is produced in China by the Dongfeng-Yueda-Kia joint venture, and adapts the same engines from the Sorento, both mated to a six-speed manual or a six-speed automatic with optional 4WD.

References

External links 

KX7
Mid-size sport utility vehicles
Crossover sport utility vehicles
Front-wheel-drive vehicles
All-wheel-drive vehicles
2010s cars
Cars introduced in 2016
Cars of China